Serena Hotel explosion may refer to:

2008 Kabul Serena Hotel attack
2014 Kabul Serena Hotel shooting
Quetta Serena Hotel bombing
August 2021 Quetta bombing